is a Japanese entertainer and impressionist who is represented by Ohta Production.

Impressions
Suzanne
Akemi Matsuno
Ryōko Hirosue
Juri Ueno
Nana Suzuki
Serina
Shoko Haida
Aya Hirano
Akina Minami
Momoko Tsugunaga (Berryz Kobo)

Filmography

Drama

Variety series

Radio series

Films

Advertisements

Other

References

External links
 
 

Japanese television personalities
Japanese impressionists (entertainers)
Japanese gravure idols
1989 births
Okamoto, Mari
People from Gunma Prefecture